Dracut is a set of tools that provide enhanced functionality for automating the Linux boot process.

Unlike existing Linux boot images, the Dracut framework attempts to introduce as little hard-coded logic into the initramfs as possible. The initramfs has essentially one purpose: locating and mounting the real root file system so that the boot process can transition to it. This functionality is dependent on device availability. Therefore, instead of having hard-coded scripts to determine device availability and suitability, Dracut's initramfs depends on the Linux device manager (udev) to create symbolic links to device nodes. When the root file system's device node appears, Dracut mounts it as the new root file system. This helps to minimize the time required in initramfs so that things like a 5-second boot are now made possible.

Most of the initramfs generation functionality in Dracut is provided by generator modules that are sourced by the main  tool to install specific functionality into the initramfs. They live in the modules subdirectory, and use functionality provided by dracut-functions to do their work.

Currently, dracut supports booting from ext2, ext3, ext4, btrfs, ISO_9660, DM RAID, MD RAID, LVM2, device mapper multipath I/O, dm-crypt, cifs, FCoE, iSCSI, NBD and NFS.

Adoption
Red Hat is the original author of dracut. Red Hat-derived Linux distributions use dracut for initramfs creation. Use outside Red Hat-derived distributions is limited.
 Fedora since version 12, Constantine
 Red Hat Enterprise Linux since version 6
 openSUSE since version 13.2, when it became the default initramfs creation tool
 SUSE Linux Enterprise Server since version 12
 Void Linux
 OpenMandriva Lx, since it was Mandriva Linux in 2011
 Mageia since Mageia 2
 Gentoo for distribution kernels since 2020, for custom kernels possible since 2010 
 KaOS 
 Bottlerocket OS

Distributions which include dracut, but do not use it by default for initramfs creation:
 Debian since version 6 (Squeeze)
 Arch Linux in extra repository
 Ubuntu Linux since 18.04

Most other distributions have made dracut available as an optional package to replace the distributions default initramfs generator.

See also

References

External links
 Dracut source files
 Dracut manual page

Linux kernel